Güngörmez can refer to:

 Güngörmez, Iğdır
 Güngörmez, Karacabey
 Güngörmez, Mecitözü